Are You There, Chelsea? (formerly known as Are You There, Vodka? It's Me, Chelsea) is an American television sitcom created by Dottie Zicklin and Julie Ann Larson for NBC. It is based on Chelsea Handler's 2008 best-selling book Are You There, Vodka? It's Me, Chelsea and aired from January 11 to March 28, 2012. The title is a take on Judy Blume's Are You There God? It's Me, Margaret.

On May 11, 2012, NBC cancelled the series after one season.

Synopsis
The sitcom is based on a book written by Chelsea Handler, a book containing comical stories from Handler's early twenties.

Cast and characters

Main cast
 Laura Prepon as Chelsea Newman
 Jake McDorman as Rick Miller
 Lauren Lapkus as Dee Dee
 Lenny Clarke as Melvin Newman
 Ali Wong as Olivia
 Mark Povinelli as Todd

Recurring cast
 Chelsea Handler as Sloane Bradley
 Natasha Leggero as Nikki Natoli
 Michaela Rose Haas as Young Chelsea

Development and production
The pilot first appeared on NBC's development slate in November 2010. On January 26, 2011, NBC placed a pilot order. Dottie Zicklin and Julie Ann Larson wrote the pilot with Gail Mancuso set to direct. Chelsea Handler serves as executive producer, along with Tom Werner, Mike Clements and Tom Brunelle.

Casting announcements began in January 2011. First to be cast was Laura Prepon, who plays the lead Chelsea Newman (originally named Chelsea Hanson in the early stages of production). Next to join the series was Angel Laketa Moore, who was cast as Shoniqua, the assistant manager of the sports bar where Chelsea works. Lauren Lapkus and Natalie Morales followed, with Lauren Lapkus playing Dee Dee, the bubbly woman whom Chelsea and Ivory live with, and Morales playing Ivory, Chelsea's long-time Cuban-American friend. Jo Koy later joined the series as Mark, a bartender where Chelsea works. Mark Povinelli then joined the show as Todd, a bar back at the sports bar where Chelsea works. Lenny Clarke was the last actor to be cast in the series, he plays Melvin, Chelsea's father, who is a big man with a big personality.

NBC ordered the pilot to series on May 13, 2011, as a midseason entry in the 2011–12 United States network television schedule. The half-hour series was produced by Warner Bros. Television.

On July 3, 2011, it was announced that Morales, Moore, and Koy were dropped from the series due to creative reasons. On August 9, 2011, Jake McDorman was revealed to have upgraded to a series regular replacing Jo Koy's character as the Bartender. In the original pilot he played Jonathan, one of Chelsea's love interests. Another change was the show's setting from Los Angeles to New Jersey.

On August 25, 2011, Ali Wong joined the cast as Olivia, Chelsea’s best friend since grade school and a fellow cocktail waitress where Chelsea works.

On November 14, 2011, NBC announced Are You There, Chelsea? would premiere on Wednesday, January 11, 2012 at 8:30/7:30c, following Whitney.

Episodes

International broadcasts
 The series is seen in Canada by Global Television Network, where it is broadcast as a simsub against the NBC telecast in most areas.
 In Australia the series premiered on the Nine Network on October 11, 2012
 The series will air in New Zealand on TV2 under the title Chelsea Straight Up.
 The series premiered in El Salvador, Costa Rica, Dominican Republic, Brazil, Chile, Guatemala, Honduras, Mexico, Nicaragua, Perú, Argentina, Uruguay, Ecuador, Colombia, and Venezuela on February 8, 2012 on Warner Channel.
 The series is seen in Germany on ProSieben. The series premiered on March 19, 2013.
 The series is seen in South Africa on MNET Series channel on the DSTV bouquet.
 The series is seen in Poland on Comedy Central Poland.
 The series is seen in Turkey on Dizimax Entertainment.
 The series is seen in Italy on Mya and Italia 2.
 The series is seen in India on Star World India.
 The series is seen in Croatia on Doma TV.

Reception 
On Rotten Tomatoes, the series has an aggregate score of 18% based on 5 positive and 23 negative critic reviews. The website’s consensus reads: "Based on Chelsea Handler's bestselling autobiography, Are you there, Chelsea? tries hard, but never matches the book's caustic wit."

References

External links

 

2010s American sitcoms
2012 American television series debuts
2012 American television series endings
NBC original programming
Television shows based on books
Television series by Warner Bros. Television Studios
Television shows set in New Jersey
English-language television shows